Cregganbaun is a village in County Mayo, Ireland.

Geology

Education
Cregganbaun National School is now disused and local children travel to modern schools at Killeen or Louisburgh.

See also

 List of towns and villages in Ireland

References

Towns and villages in County Mayo